Ivanec is a town in Varaždin County, Croatia.

Ivanec may also refer to:

 Ivanec Bistranski, a village near Zaprešić, Zagreb County, Croatia
 Ivanec Križevački, a village near Križevci, Koprivnica-Križevci County, Croatia
 Koprivnički Ivanec, a village and a municipality in Koprivnica-Križevci County, Croatia